"The 1923 Liverpool Edge Hill by-election was held on 6 March 1923.  The by-election was held due to the resignation of the incumbent Conservative MP, William Rutherford.  It was won by the Labour candidate Jack Hayes.

References

Liverpool Edge Hill by-election
Liverpool Edge Hill by-election
Liverpool Edge Hill by-election
1920s in Liverpool
Edge Hill, 1923